The Beriev Be-30 (NATO reporting name "Cuff") is a Russian regional airliner and utility transport aircraft designed by the Beriev Design Bureau. It was developed specifically for Aeroflot local service routes using short, grass airstrips. It was also designed to be used in the light transport, aerial survey and air ambulance roles. It competed against the Antonov An-28 and the Czechoslovakian LET-410.

Design and development

The original design featured interconnected engines, so that in case of one engine failing, the remaining engine could drive both propellers. This feature was not implemented in the production version.

The first prototype flew on 3 March 1967, fitted with Shvetsov ASh-21 piston engines, while the first production prototype flew on 18 July 1968, using more powerful Glushenkov TVD-10 turboprop engines. The first deliveries to Aeroflot were in mid-1969.

The Be-30 was designed for a flight crew of two with passenger arrangements for 14 (in the Be-30) to a maximum of 17 (in the Be-32) seated two abreast. Corporate shuttle configuration seated seven. The air ambulance configuration could accommodate nine stretcher patients, six seated patients and one medical attendant.

Three Be-30s and five Be-32s were built in the late 1960s before the program was terminated. In the early 1990s one of the original Be-32s was converted to a Be-32K demonstrator and presented at the 1993 Paris and Dubai air shows. It was painted in the colors of the now defunct Moscow Airways which had ordered 50 aircraft but ceased operations before any could be built or delivered.

Variants

 Be-30 Prototype first flew on 3 March 1967, powered by two  Shvetsov ASh-21 radial piston engines, driving three-blade constant speed propellers. Fuel capacity .
 Be-30: Production model
 Be-30A: With 'high-density' seating for 21-23 passengers
 Be-32: Upgraded model first displayed in 1993. Two  Glushenkov TVD-10B turboprops driving three-blade constant speed propellers.
 Be-32K: 'Westernized' version with two  Pratt & Whitney Canada PT6A-65B turboprops driving three-blade Hartzell reversible pitch propellers. Fuel capacity .

Operators
Operators of the Beriev Be-30 (in order by country)

 Air Africa

 Moscow Airways

 Aeroflot

Specifications (Be-30)

References

External links

 
 Beriev site
 Be-30/32 at Airliners.net

Be-0030
1960s Soviet airliners
Aircraft first flown in 1967
High-wing aircraft
Twin-turboprop tractor aircraft